Point of No Return is an album by American singer Frank Sinatra, released in 1962.

As the title reflects, the album contains Sinatra's final original recordings with Capitol Records before moving to his own Reprise Records label to achieve more artistic freedom with his recordings. However, Sinatra would later return to Capitol in order to record Duets (1993) and Duets II (1994).

Sinatra had already begun recording with Reprise as early as 1960 and had already recorded Ring-A-Ding-Ding, I Remember Tommy, and Sinatra Swings by the time these sessions occurred. He recorded this album in a hurried two-day session in September 1961 to fulfill his contract.

The album was still a special occasion, reuniting Sinatra with Axel Stordahl, the arranger and conductor who helped Sinatra rise to stardom in the 1940s. Sinatra rushed through the sessions to fulfill his obligation to Capitol, something which Stordahl said upset him. Stordahl also arranged the vocalist's first Capitol session back in 1953, so his presence gave a sense of closure to the Capitol era.

In an interesting side note, Sinatra recorded a different version of "I'll Be Seeing You" only months apart during the very same year on I Remember Tommy for Reprise.

Track listing
"(Ah, the Apple Trees) When the World Was Young" (Johnny Mercer, M. Philippe-Gerard, Angele Marie T. Vannier) - 3:48
"I'll Remember April" (Don Raye, Gene de Paul, Patricia Johnston) - 2:50
"September Song" (Kurt Weill, Maxwell Anderson) - 4:21
"A Million Dreams Ago" (Lew Quadling, Eddie Howard, Dick Jurgens) - 2:41
"I'll See You Again" (Noël Coward) - 2:44
"There Will Never Be Another You" (Mack Gordon, Harry Warren) - 3:09
"Somewhere along the Way" (Kurt Adams, Sammy Gallop) - 3:01
"It's a Blue World" (Bob Wright, Chet Forrest) - 2:49
"These Foolish Things (Remind Me of You)" (Jack Strachey, Harry Link, Holt Marvell) - 3:59
"As Time Goes By" (Herman Hupfeld) - 3:17
"I'll Be Seeing You" (Sammy Fain, Irving Kahal) - 2:47
"Memories of You" (Eubie Blake, Andy Razaf) - 3:53
 CD reissue bonus tracks not included on the original 1962 release:
"Day In, Day Out" (Rube Bloom, Mercer) - 3:19
"Don't Make a Beggar of Me" (Al Sherman) - 3:05
"Lean Baby" (Billy May, Roy Alfred) - 2:35
"I'm Walking Behind You" (Billy Reid) - 2:57

The bonus tracks represent the rest of Sinatra's work with Axel Stordahl on Capitol Records. These songs were recorded at Sinatra's first Capitol session in April 1953 and were produced by Voyle Gilmore.

Personnel
 Frank Sinatra - vocals
 Axel Stordahl - arranger, conductor
 Heinie Beau - "ghost arranger"
 Conrad Gozzo - lead trumpet

References

Frank Sinatra albums
Capitol Records albums
1962 albums
Albums produced by Dave Cavanaugh
Albums conducted by Axel Stordahl
Albums arranged by Axel Stordahl
Albums produced by Voyle Gilmore
Albums arranged by Heinie Beau
Albums recorded at Capitol Studios